Yaana is a 2019 Kannada language road film written and directed by Vijayalakshmi Singh and produced by Harish Sherigar and Sharmila Sherigar under banners of i Entertainment and ACME Movies International Production. The music of film is scored by Joshua Sridhar and Anoop Seelin. The film is introducing: Vaibhavi, Vainidhi, Vaisiri, Sumukha, Chakravarthy and Abhishek. The other cast includes Suhasini, Sadhu Kokila, Chikanna, Rangayana Raghu  and Ananth Nag. The film follows teenagers collegiates, Maya (played by Vaibhavi), Anjali (played by Vaisiri), and Nandini (played by Vainidhi), who decide to take a road trip to Goa to de-stress. The film was theatrically released on 12 July 2019.

Plot 
The film tells about three friends of individual stories who meet unexpectedly and plan a road trip to Goa for get out of their stressful life. The rest of the story is how they spend time in Goa.

Cast 
 Vainidhi Jagdish as Nandini
 Vaibhavi Jagdish as Maya
 Vaisiri Jagdish as Anjali
 Shivraj K R Pate
 Apoorva Gururaja as Apoorva
 Ananth Nag
 Suhasini Maniratnam
 Sadhu Kokila
 Rangayana Raghu
 Chikkanna
 Hampa Angadi
 Sumukha
 Abhishek

Release
The official trailer of the film was launched by Lahari Music on 27 June 2019.

Shooting 
The shoot took place in Bengaluru, Goa and Belagavi.

Trivia 
Vaibhavi (Maya), Vaisiri (Anjali) and Vainidhi (Nandini) are triplets in real life. Their parents are Jai Jagadish and Vijayalakshmi Singh.

OTT Release 
The movie rights was sold to Amazon Prime Video.

Soundtrack 

The soundtrack is composed by Joshua Sridhar and Anoop Seelin.

References

External links
 

2019 films
2010s Kannada-language films
Indian road movies
Films scored by Joshua Sridhar
Films directed by Vijayalakshmi Singh